Luis Raudales (born 21 May 1956) is a Honduran long-distance runner. He competed in the marathon at the 1976 Summer Olympics.

References

1956 births
Living people
Athletes (track and field) at the 1975 Pan American Games
Athletes (track and field) at the 1976 Summer Olympics
Honduran male long-distance runners
Honduran male marathon runners
Olympic athletes of Honduras
Place of birth missing (living people)
Pan American Games competitors for Honduras